Bosnia and Herzegovina participated in the Eurovision Song Contest 2004 with the song "In the Disco" written by Vesna Pisarović. The song was performed by Deen. Songwriter Vesna Pisarović represented Croatia in the Eurovision Song Contest 2002 with the song "Everything I Want" where she placed eleventh in the competition. On 15 January 2004, the Bosnian broadcaster Public Broadcasting Service of Bosnia and Herzegovina (PBSBiH) revealed that they had internally selected Deen to compete at the 2004 contest in Istanbul, Turkey, while the national final BH Eurosong 2004 was organised in order to select his song. Five songs participated during the show on 6 March 2004 where a combination of an eleven-member jury and public televoting selected "In the Disco" as the winning song.

Bosnia and Herzegovina competed in the semi-final of the Eurovision Song Contest which took place on 12 May 2004. Performing during the show in position 21, "In the Disco" was announced among the top 10 entries of the semi-final and therefore qualified to compete in the final on 14 May. It was later revealed that Bosnia and Herzegovina placed seventh out of the 22 participating countries in the semi-final with 133 points. In the final, Bosnia and Herzegovina performed in position 12 and placed ninth out of the 24 participating countries, scoring 91 points.

Background

The nation's best placing in the contest was seventh, which it achieved in 1999 with the song "Putnici" performed by Dino and Béatrice.

The Bosnian national broadcaster, Public Broadcasting Service of Bosnia and Herzegovina (PBSBiH), broadcasts the event within Bosnia and Herzegovina and organises the selection process for the nation's entry. PBSBiH confirmed their intentions to participate at the 2004 Eurovision Song Contest on 28 December 2003. In , the broadcaster selected the Bosnian artist through an internal selection process, while a national final was set up to choose the song.

Before Eurovision

Artist selection 
On 28 December 2003, the broadcaster opened the application period for artists to submit their entries up until 9 January 2004. Artists were required to be citizens of Bosnia and Herzegovina, have at least three years of television or concert appearances, and have released at least two albums and three music videos. 5 valid applications out of 7 were received at the closing of the deadline and on 15 January 2004, PBSBiH announced that they had internally selected Deen to represent Bosnia and Herzegovina in Istanbul. Deen previously attempted to represent Bosnia and Herzegovina in the Eurovision Song Contest by participating in several national finals: in 1999 as part of Seven Up with the song "Daj, spusti se" which placed third, in 2001 with the song "10 miliona ljubavi" which placed seventh, and in 2003 with the song "Taxi" which placed second. The broadcaster also announced that a national final would be held to select the song to be performed at the contest. In the first round, each juror awards between 1 and 5 points to each singer, once for voice, once for performance. In the second round, each juror awards between 1 and 4 points, once for voice, once for performance. In the third round, each juror awards between 1 and 3 points, once for voice, once for performance. In the final round, each juror awards between 1 and 2 points, points, once for voice, once for performance.

BH Eurosong 2004 
Following the artist announcement on 15 January 2004, the broadcaster opened the submission period for composers to submit their songs up until 17 January 2004. Songwriters were required to be citizens of Bosnia and Herzegovina. 32 submissions were received at the closing of the deadline and on 11 February 2004, PBSBiH announced the six songs selected to compete in the national final. Among the selected songwriters were 1993 Bosnian Eurovision entrant Muhamed Fazlagić and 2002 Croatian Eurovision entrant Vesna Pisarović. The song "Pridi bliže" was later disqualified from the competition due to songwriter Andrej Babić not having Bosnian citizenship.

The final was held on 6 March 2004 at the PBSBiH studios in Sarajevo, hosted by Ana Vilenica and Enis Bešlagić, and was broadcast on BHTV1, Hayat TV and BH Radio 1. All five competing songs were performed by Deen and the 50/50 combination of votes from a jury panel and public televoting that ran between 2 and 6 March 2004 selected "In the Disco" as the winning song. The eleven-member jury panel that voted during the show consisted of Vesna Arapović (professor at Music School "Mostar" and director of children's choir "Pavarotti"), Ivan Čavlović (professor at the Musicological Society FBiH), Samir Čulić (journalist, DJ and music editor), Ferida Duraković (professor and translator), Marin Gradac (music professor and music editor), Miroslav Kenjalović (Dean of Academy of Arts at the University of Banja Luka), Slobodan Kovačević (guitarist and architect), Tijana Vignjević (conductor and music professor), Vesna Andree-Zaimović (musicologist), Ninoslav Verber (music professor and President of PBSBiH Musical Production) and Deen. "In the Disco" was the first song performed entirely in the English language that was selected to represent Bosnia and Herzegovina at the Eurovision Song Contest.

At Eurovision

It was announced that the competition's format would be expanded to include a semi-final in 2004. According to the rules, all nations with the exceptions of the host country, the "Big Four" (France, Germany, Spain and the United Kingdom), and the ten highest placed finishers in the 2003 contest are required to qualify from the semi-final on 12 May 2004 in order to compete for the final on 15 May 2004; the top ten countries from the semi-final progress to the final. On 23 March 2004, a special allocation draw was held which determined the running order for the semi-final and Bosnia and Herzegovina was set to perform in position 7, following the entry from Serbia and Montenegro and before the entry from the Netherlands. At the end of the semi-final, Bosnia and Herzegovina was announced as having finished in the top 10 and consequently qualifying for the grand final. It was later revealed that Bosnia and Herzegovina placed seventh in the semi-final, receiving a total of 133 points. The draw for the running order for the final was done by the presenters during the announcement of the ten qualifying countries during the semi-final and Bosnia and Herzegovina was drawn to perform in position 12, following the entry from Croatia and before the entry from Belgium. Bosnia and Herzegovina placed ninth in the final, scoring 91 points.

The semi-final and the final were broadcast in Bosnia and Herzegovina on BHT 1 with commentary by Dejan Kukrić. The Bosnian spokesperson, who announced the Bosnian votes during the final, was Mija Martina who represented Bosnia and Herzegovina in the Eurovision Song Contest 2003.

Voting 
Below is a breakdown of points awarded to Bosnia and Herzegovina and awarded by Bosnia and Herzegovina in the semi-final and grand final of the contest. The nation awarded its 12 points to Serbia and Montenegro in the semi-final and the final of the contest.

Points awarded to Bosnia and Herzegovina

Points awarded by Bosnia and Herzegovina

References

2004
Countries in the Eurovision Song Contest 2004
Eurovision